Susquehanna Depot, often referred to simply as Susquehanna, is a borough in Susquehanna County, Pennsylvania, United States, located on the Susquehanna River  southeast of Binghamton, New York. In the past, railroad locomotives and railroad cars were made here. It is also known for its Pennsylvania Bluestone quarries.

The behavioral scientist B. F. Skinner was born in Susquehanna. The American writer John Gardner lived the last few years of his life in Susquehanna, where he died in a motorcycle accident in 1982.

The borough population was 1,365 as of the 2020 census.

History 
The New York and Erie Railroad (later reorganized as the Erie Railroad) built a rail line through the county in 1848, including the Starrucca Viaduct: a monumental stone structure spanning Starrucca Creek. Concurrently, the railroad established workshops in what would eventually be known as Susquehanna Depot. Initially, 350 workers were employed. The line opened for traffic in 1851.

The borough was incorporated on August 19, 1853, from part of Harmony Township. In 1863, the Erie shops were expanded to cover  and they employed 700 workers by 1865, and later over 1,000. The complex included a 33-stall roundhouse, a rail yard, a foundry, gas works, oil works and offices.  By 1887, the shops were producing five locomotives per month. The Susquehanna railroad station, which included a large hotel called the Starrucca House, opened in 1865.

The railroad converted the Starrucca House to offices and staff housing c. 1903. A new roundhouse complex was constructed between 1904 and 1911, and other shop buildings were added through the 1920s. In 1928, the railroad relocated its locomotive shops to Hornell, New York, and moved other shops out of Susquehanna in 1929, but retained a coach shop with reduced staffing through the 1950s. In 1952, Erie closed the roundhouse as it converted its steam locomotive roster to diesel locomotives. By the end of the decade, Erie had moved all of its remaining shop operations to Meadville.

Erie merged into the Erie–Lackawanna Railroad (EL) in 1960, and the latter ended passenger train service through Susquehanna on November 27, 1966. EL went bankrupt in 1972 and was absorbed into Conrail in 1976. Most of the railroad shop buildings were demolished in 1980 and 1981.

With the demise of the local railroad industry, Susquehanna now has many small resident-owned businesses scattered along Main Street. Recent renovations to several Main Street buildings mark the first significant upturn in the local economy in several decades.

The Erie Railroad Station was added to the National Register of Historic Places in 1972.

Geography 
Susquehanna Depot is located at  (41.944601, -75.604025).

Demographics 

As of the census of 2010, there were 1,643 people, 636 households, and 436 families residing in the borough. The racial makeup of the borough was 97.1% White, 0.4% African American, 0.3% American Indian or Alaska Native, 1% Asian, 0.4% some other race, and 0.8% from two or more races. Hispanic or Latino of any race were 2% of the population.

There were 636 households, out of which 32.4% had children under the age of 18 living with them, 41.8% were married couples living together, 19.3% had a female householder with no husband present, and 31.4% were non-families. 26.4% of all households were made up of individuals, and 10.1% had someone living alone who was 65 years of age or older. The average household size was 2.50 and the average family size was 2.99.

In the borough, the population was spread out, with 25.1% under the age of 18, 60.4% from 18 to 64, and 14.5% who were 65 years of age or older. The median age was 38 years.

The median income for a household in the borough was $35,197, and the median income for a family was $42,422. Males had a median income of $33,929 versus $27,969 for females. The per capita income for the borough was $17,637. About 16.6% of families and 20.8% of the population were below the poverty line, including 27.8% of those under age 18 and 10.8% of those age 65 or over.

References

External links 

 Susquehanna Community School District

Boroughs in Susquehanna County, Pennsylvania
Populated places established in 1794
Pennsylvania populated places on the Susquehanna River
1853 establishments in Pennsylvania